Paul Hornschemeier (born October 27, 1977) is an artist, author, and director based in Pasadena, California. He is known for his thought-provoking explorations of the layered complexities of human life in his work.

Biography
Hornschemeier was born in Cincinnati, Ohio, in 1977 and raised in nearby rural Georgetown, Ohio. As a child he liked to draw, and after discovering his first Steve Ditko Spider-Man comic, he began creating his own comic books.

While majoring in philosophy and psychology at Ohio State University, Hornschemeier was introduced to the graphic novel Ghost World by Daniel Clowes and began exploring underground and literary comics. He saw that comics could be a venue for exploring issues from his studies and other interests, and within a year he began publishing his own black and white comics under the banner Sequential, a series of work that has since been compiled by AdHouse Books as The Collected Sequential.

From 2002 to 2007, Hornschemeier also sang and played guitar for the (now defunct) band Arks. Since 2008 he has periodically released music under the name Music Hall.

Career

Comics 
In 2001, after moving to Chicago, Hornschemeier self-published the final issue of Sequential, and began publishing the full-color comics series Forlorn Funnies with Absence of Ink Press. In 2004, Dark Horse Comics published his first graphic novel titled Mother, Come Home.

Hornschemeier went on to create graphic novels The Three Paradoxes (2007) and the New York Times-bestseller Life with Mr. Dangerous (2011), as well as various short story collections and art books. In 2007, he colored and art-directed the Marvel Comics limited series (and collection) Omega the Unknown.

Film and television 
Hornschemeier's animation and artwork appear on IFC’s Comedy Bang! Bang!. In 2014 he wrote and directed the live-action short Daniel in the Factory. Around that time he also began producing Forlorn TV, an animated YouTube series of monologues and short stories.

He is currently at work writing, directing, producing, animating, and editing Giant Sloth (a Kickstarter-funded animated short featuring the voices of Paul Giamatti, Jason Mantzoukas, and Saturday Night Live cast member Kate McKinnon.)

Art and creative direction 
While attending Ohio State University, Hornschemeier began working as a graphics editor. He later went on to pursue advertising and publication design, including working as a contract designer at  Ogilvy & Mather. Most recently, he has acted as the creative director for Margo Mitchell Media.

Other work 
Hornschemeier's prose and illustrations have appeared in publications ranging from Life magazine to The Wall Street Journal to McSweeney's. He has also contributed illustration and art direction to clients ranging from This American Life to Intel. Additionally, he served as creative writing faculty for The University of Chicago and has lectured internationally on the philosophy of narrative and art creation.

He lives in Pasadena, California, where he works on a variety of book, TV, and film projects.

Bibliography

Filmography

Awards and nominations
 2004 (nomination) Eisner Award for Best Limited Series, Best Writer/Artist, and Best Coloring (Forlorn Funnies)
 2007 Victoria and Albert Museum Illustration Award
 2007 Romics Awards — Best American graphic novel (Mother, Come Home)

References

External links
 Beitel Creative 
 Margo Mitchell Media 
 Forlorn Funnies 
 The Daily Forlorn 
 Forlorn TV 

American comics artists
Alternative cartoonists
American graphic novelists
Artists from Cincinnati
1977 births
Living people
American male novelists